Grevillea calliantha, commonly known as Foote's grevillea, Cataby grevillea or black magic grevillea, is a species of flowering plant in the family Proteaceae and is endemic to a restricted part of the south-west of Western Australia. It is a spreading, compact shrub with pinnatipartite leaves with linear lobes, and pale yellow to apricot-coloured flowers with a maroon-black to reddish style.

Description

Taxonomy
Grevillea calliantha was first formally described in 1991 by Robert Owen Makinson and Peter M. Olde in the journal Telopea from specimens collected near Cataby in 1989. The specific epithet (calliantha) means "beautiful-flowered".

Distribution and habitat
This grevillea grows in heathland in sandy soil and is restricted an area north of Cataby in the Geraldton Sandplains and Swan Coastal Plain biogeographic regions of south-western Western Australia.

Conservation status
Grevillea calliantha is listed as "endangered" under the Australian Government Environment Protection and Biodiversity Conservation Act 1999 and as "Threatened Flora (Declared Rare Flora — Extant)" by the Department of Biodiversity, Conservation and Attractions. An Interim Recovery Plan has been prepared.

References

calliantha
Proteales of Australia
Eudicots of Western Australia
Taxa named by Robert Owen Makinson
Plants described in 1991